Rui Gomes may refer to:

Government
Rui Gomes de Abreu, alcaide (c.1460–1530?), who served as Alcaide Mayor of Elvas, Portugal
Ruy Gómez de Silva, 1st Prince of Éboli (1516 – 1573), a Portuguese noble, and adviser to the Spanish King
Rui Gomes (politician), East Timorese politician, administrator and academic

Sports
Rui Gomes (footballer, born 1987), Portuguese footballer
Rui Gomes (footballer, born 1997), Portuguese footballer